Gamhariya is one of the administrative divisions of Madhepura district in the Indian state of  Bihar. The block headquarters are located at a distance of 18 km from the district headquarters, namely, Madhepura.

Geography
Gamhariya is located at

School
Residential Purushottam shishu vidya mandir Gamharia madhepura 852108

Panchayats
Panchayats in Gamhariya community development block are: Bhabani, Bhelwa, Gamhariya, Kodihar Tarewe, Orahi Ekperha, Itwa Jiwachhpur, Chikni and Jiwachhpur.

Important Person:

Bhavesh Kumar JTO at BSNL Odisha Circle.

Demographics
In the 2001 census Gamhariya Block had a population of 65,125.

References

Community development blocks in Madhepura district